Júlia Sardá (born December 1, 1982) is a Brazilian rugby sevens player. She was selected as a member of the Brazil women's national rugby sevens team to the 2016 Summer Olympics.

References

External links 
 

1982 births
Living people
Brazil international rugby sevens players
Female rugby sevens players
Rugby sevens players at the 2016 Summer Olympics
Olympic rugby sevens players of Brazil
Brazilian female rugby union players
Brazil international women's rugby sevens players
Brazilian rugby sevens players